Cydonie Camille Mothersille (born 19 March 1978) is a female former track and field sprinter from the Cayman Islands. Her speciality at the beginning of her career was the 100 metres, while the 200 metres gradually became her main event. She represented her country at four Olympic Games from 1996 to 2008, six World Championships in Athletics, and three Commonwealth Games. Her greatest achievements were in the 200 m, including a bronze at the 2001 World Championships in Athletics, Commonwealth gold in 2010 and a silver at the 2003 Pan American Games. Her World Championship medal was the first ever for her nation.

Mothersille was born in Jamaica in 1978 and moved to Grand Cayman, Cayman Islands at age 7. While in high school, she was discovered by her high school's physical education teacher Evelyn Rockette and began her track career. Mothersille began competing for the Cayman Islands by competing in the CARIFTA Games, where she performed well with a 100/200 m sprint double in 1996. In 1996, she was awarded the Austin Sealy Trophy for the most outstanding athlete of the 1996 CARIFTA Games.

While in college she competed in the 100 m, 200 m, 4 × 100 m relay and 4 × 400 m relay for Clemson University. She was a part of the Clemson All American 4 x 100 and 4 x 400 team.

In 2011, Cydonie was the highest paid athlete from the Cayman Islands (male or female) making $85,000 (USD). Mothersille is married to Ato Stephens.

Mothersille was coached by Henry Rolle.

International competitions

References

External links

1978 births
Living people
Caymanian female sprinters
Olympic athletes of the Cayman Islands
Athletes (track and field) at the 1996 Summer Olympics
Athletes (track and field) at the 2000 Summer Olympics
Athletes (track and field) at the 2004 Summer Olympics
Athletes (track and field) at the 2008 Summer Olympics
Pan American Games silver medalists for the Cayman Islands
Pan American Games medalists in athletics (track and field)
Athletes (track and field) at the 1999 Pan American Games
Athletes (track and field) at the 2003 Pan American Games
Commonwealth Games gold medallists for the Cayman Islands
Commonwealth Games medallists in athletics
Athletes (track and field) at the 2002 Commonwealth Games
Athletes (track and field) at the 2006 Commonwealth Games
Athletes (track and field) at the 2010 Commonwealth Games
Central American and Caribbean Games gold medalists for the Cayman Islands
World Athletics Championships athletes for the Cayman Islands
World Athletics Championships medalists
Clemson Tigers women's track and field athletes
Jamaican emigrants to the Cayman Islands
Competitors at the 2010 Central American and Caribbean Games
IAAF Continental Cup winners
Central American and Caribbean Games medalists in athletics
Medalists at the 2003 Pan American Games
Olympic female sprinters
Medallists at the 2010 Commonwealth Games